The Wanganui River is in the West Coast of the South Island of New Zealand.

After heavy rain in January 2013 the flooded river partially washed away the single-lane road bridge that carries , closing the only through road on the West Coast. 

Gravel buildup has gradually raised the riverbed, and in 2021 the West Coast Regional Council planned to elevate stopbanks by 1 m at a cost of $5.7 million to protect neighbouring farmland from flooding. Farmers protested the rates rise that would be needed to pay back this 30-year loan, and suggested the Department of Conservation should contribute.

References

Westland District
Rivers of the West Coast, New Zealand
Rivers of New Zealand